Zalog is a village in the Municipality of Municipality of Straža in southeastern Slovenia. It lies on the left bank of the Krka River. The area is part of the historical region of Lower Carniola. The municipality is now included in the Southeast Slovenia Statistical Region. 

The local church is dedicated to Saint Martin and belongs to the Parish of Prečna. It is a medieval building that was restyled in the Baroque in the 17th century.

References

External links
Zalog at Geopedia

Populated places in the Municipality of Straža